Banfield may refer to:

People 
 Albert Banfield (1912–1970), English professional footballer
 Alexander William Francis Banfield (Frank Banfield, A. W. F, Banfield; 1918–1996), Canadian mammalogist
 Ann Banfield (fl. 1975–2000), Professor Emeritus of English
 Ashleigh Banfield (born 1967), Canadian-born TV journalist
 Donald Hubert Louis Banfield (1916–2014), trade unionist and politician in the State of South Australia
 Drew Banfield (born 1974), Australian Rules footballer
 Edmund James Banfield (1852–1923), Australian newspaper proprietor, writer and naturalist
 Edward Banfield (railroad engineer) (died 1872), Argentina-based British railway engineer and businessman
 Edward C. Banfield (1916–1999), American political scientist
 Gottfried von Banfield (1890-1986), Austro-Hungarian naval aviator in the First World War, later businessman
 Jillian Banfield (born 1959), American geomicrobiologist and biogeochemist
 John Banfield (1875–1945), British trade unionist and Labour Party politician, Member of Parliament (MP) for Wednesbury 1932–1945
 Mildred Banfield (1914–1991), American politician
 Raffaello de Banfield (1922–2008), British-born Italian composer
 Stephen Banfield (born 1951), British musicologist

Other 
 Banfield, Buenos Aires, a city in Argentina
 Club Atlético Banfield, an Argentine football (soccer) team
 Banfield Expressway, the portion of Interstate 84 (west) that is in Portland, Oregon, United States
 Banfield (pet hospitals), an operator of veterinary clinics across the United States, Mexico, and in the UK
 Banfield (TV program), a news interview TV program hosted by Ashleigh Banfield
 Banfield, Michigan, a village in Barry County, Michigan, USA
 Mount Banfield, a peak in Antarctica

See also
 John Bandfield (1826–1903), New York politician